Marleyimyia is a genus of bee fly. It was named by Albert John Hesse in 1956; the name is in honor of Harold Walter Bell-Marley.  it consists of three species:
 M. goliath  — Peninsular Malaysia
 M. natalensis  — Southern Africa
 M. xylocopae  — Southern Africa

References

Bombyliidae genera